Rubropsichia fuesliniana is a species of moth of the family Tortricidae. It is found in Brazil and Suriname.

References

Moths described in 1781
Rubropsichia